William Piper (January 1, 17741852) was an American politician from Pennsylvania who served as a Democratic-Republican member of the U.S. House of Representatives for Pennsylvania's 7th congressional district from 1811 to 1813 and for Pennsylvania's 8th congressional district from 1813 to 1817.

He was born at Bloody Run (now Everett) in the Province of Pennsylvania to John and Elizabeth Lusk Piper.  He commanded a regiment during the War of 1812, and served as adjutant general of Pennsylvania after the war. He served in the Pennsylvania State Senate for the 14th district from 1817 to 1820 and for the 22nd district from 1821 to 1832. Piper was elected as a Democratic-Republican to the Twelfth, Thirteenth, and Fourteenth Congresses.  He died in Hopewell Township, Pennsylvania in 1852.  Interment in the Piper Cemetery on his farm in Hopewell Township.

Footnotes

Sources

The Political Graveyard

|-

1774 births
1852 deaths
19th-century American politicians
Burials in Pennsylvania
Democratic-Republican Party members of the United States House of Representatives from Pennsylvania
Pennsylvania state senators
People from Everett, Pennsylvania
People from Pennsylvania in the War of 1812